Tadami (written: 只見) may refer to:

, town in Minamiaizu District, Fukushima Prefecture, Japan
, train station in Tadami, Fukushima
, river in Fukushima Prefecture, Japan
Tadami Dam, dam on the Tadami River, Fukushima Prefecture, Japan
, railway line in Fukushima and Niigata Prefecture, Japan

People with the given name
, Japanese poet
Tadami Ueno (born 1948), Japanese golfer

Japanese masculine given names